John J. Seevers is a former American football coach. He served as the head football coach at Concordia College—now known as Concordia University Nebraska—in Seward, Nebraska from 1970 to 1976, record of 31–32–3. He lettered in football, basketball, baseball, and track at Concordia before graduating in 1952.

Head coaching record

References

Year of birth missing (living people)
Living people
American football quarterbacks
Concordia Bulldogs baseball players
Concordia Bulldogs football coaches
Concordia Bulldogs football players
Concordia Bulldogs men's basketball players
Concordia Bulldogs men's track and field athletes
People from Sidney, Nebraska
Coaches of American football from Nebraska
Players of American football from Nebraska
Baseball players from Nebraska
Concordia University Nebraska alumni
Basketball players from Nebraska
Track and field athletes from Nebraska